Raymond or Ray Lambert may refer to:

Raymond Lambert, Swiss mountaineer
Ray Lambert, Welsh footballer
Ray Lambert, character in Babes on Broadway